Atavist Inc. was launched in 2011 and is the company behind the Atavist multimedia publishing platform and The Atavist Magazine. It was founded by Jefferson Rabb, Evan Ratliff, and Nicholas Thompson. In the spring of 2015, the company released its free publishing platform. The new platform allows users to create and sell long-form content across multiple platforms.

Early investors in the company include IAC, Eric Schmidt, and the Founders Fund. It is now owned by Automattic.

History 
The California Sunday Magazine, Mental Floss, The Daily Dot, The Christian Science Monitor, Esquire, and Vice, among other outlets, used the Atavist platform to publish eye-catching feature stories on the web.

Atavist Books, a multi-platform book publishing company, was launched in partnership with Barry Diller, Scott Rudin, and Frances Coady, in the spring of 2014, with Sleep Donation by Karen Russell as the venture's first novella. All titles were produced and distributed using the Atavist platform. In the following months after Atavist Books published its first title, five more e-titles were published. In October 2014, the initiative was shut down. A spokesperson of the company said, "We have identified that the market for highly innovative enhanced full-length literary eBooks still heavily relies on a print component and has yet to emerge."

In 2015, Atavist Inc. reportedly cut half of its staff "as funding began to dried up".

In June 2018, Atavist announced that it was being acquired by Automattic, the parent company of WordPress.com. In April 2021, the magazine moved to WordPress.com, joining the News pack community of publishers. News pack is an advanced open-source publishing and revenue-generating platform for news organizations, created by WordPress.com and the Google News Initiative.

The Atavist Magazine is a monthly publication of longform narrative journalism. It has been nominated for eight National Magazine Awards since its launch in 2011, and in 2015 it won for best Feature Writing with its piece "Love and Ruin," by James Verini. It was the first digital-only publication to receive the award. Its titles have also been honored by the Livingston Awards, the Bayeux-Calvados Normandy Awards for War Correspondents, and the Clarion Awards, among other prizes.

In June 2021, it launched its first-ever narrative podcast, No Place Like Home, about the theft of a pair of the ruby slippers worn by Judy Garland in The Wizard of Oz. The podcast was produced by Cadence 13.

Many of its stories have been optioned for film/TV projects. The magazine is represented by Creative Artists Agency. The editor in chief is Seyward Darby. The art director is Ed Johnson.

See also
 Tech companies in the New York metropolitan area

References

External links
 Nieman Storyboard
 Top Apps Today

Companies based in Brooklyn
Online journalism
Software companies based in New York City
Automattic
2018 mergers and acquisitions
Defunct software companies of the United States
American companies established in 2009